Alan Munde (pronounced "mun-dee") (born November 4, 1946) is an American five-string banjo player and bluegrass musician.

Biography
Born in Norman, Oklahoma, Munde learned banjo from a well-regarded Oklahoman banjo player, Ed Shelton. He frequently played amateur gigs around the state where he first met Byron Berline at the University of Oklahoma. Shelton introduced Munde to three fine Dallas bluegrass players - Mitchell Land, Louis "Bosco" Land and Harless "Tootie" Williams - and the four of them joined to form "The Stone Mountain Boys" in 1965. Alan moved to Kentucky in January 1969 after he had graduated from college to play with Wayne Stewart and Sam Bush in a group called Poor Richard's Almanac.

"Wayne Stewart had this idea for a group with this kid he knew in Kentucky named Sam Bush, who was probably 15. So I moved to Hopkinsville, Kentucky, and we formed Poor Richard's Almanac. Not long after, I got my draft notice, but before I left, Sam, Wayne and I made this tape, later released by Ridge Runner Records, called Poor Richard's Almanac, that was a lot of the instrumental things we were doing. I then went back to Oklahoma, was rejected by the Army, and worked in Norman that summer."

Munde joined the legendary bluegrass musician Jimmy Martin in 1969. He played with Martin as one of the Sunny Mountain Boys from October 1969 to October 1971, and in the meantime earned his living by working as a school teacher in Nashville.

In 1972, Munde became a member of the Flying Burrito Brothers, performing with Byron Berline. After a European tour, the Burritos split up and Munde joined Country Gazette, then consisting of Roger Bush on bass, Kenny Wertz on guitar, and on the fiddle, Byron Berline, who had formed Country Gazette earlier in the year. Country Gazette went on to record their first album "Traitor In Our Midst" in 1972. For the next twenty years Alan remained a central figure in Country Gazette, playing with notable musicians such as Roland White, Clarence White, Joe Carr and Gene Wooten.

In 1977, Alan Munde and mandolinist Sam Bush recorded "Together Again for the First Time" with Roland White, Curtis Burch and John Cowan (both members of legendary New Grass Revival with Sam Bush).

Alan currently serves on the board of directors of the International Bluegrass Music Association. He taught full-time in the bluegrass and country music program at South Plains College from 1986 to May 2007.

Munde wrote and hosted a monthly 5 string Banjo column for Frets Magazine during the 1980s

His current band is called Alan Munde Gazette. The band features Alan Munde on banjo, Elliott Rogers on guitar and vocals, Bill Honker on bass and vocals, Steve Smith on mandolin and vocals, and Nate Lee on fiddle vocals.

In 2021, Alan won the Steve Martin Banjo Prize.

Discography
 Alan Munde Gazette, "Made To Last", Munde's Child Records (2008)
 Alan Munde & Wayne Shrubsall, "Old Friends", CBP-2003-CD (2003)
 Alan Munde, "Solo Banjo, Just Banjo, All Banjo, Nothing But Banjo", CPB-2002-CD (2002)
 Various Artists, "Long Journey Home: Bluegrass Songs of the Stanley Brothers", Rounder Records, ROUN0349 (2002)
 Various Artists, "Knee Deep in Bluegrass: The AcuTab Sessions", Rebel Records, (2000)
 Alan Munde, "Texas Fiddle Favorites for Banjo", Mel Bay,  MELBY02984 (2000)
 Alan Munde & Joe Carr, "Welcome to West Texas", Rounder Records, FLY 669 (1998)
 Joe Carr & Alan Munde, "Windy Days and Dusty Skies", Rounder Records,	FLY 644 (1995)
 Alan Munde, "Blue Ridge Express", Rounder Records, ROUN0301 (1994)
 Alan Munde, "Festival Favorites Revisited", Rounder Records, 	ROUN0311 (1993)
 Alan Munde & Country Gazette,	"Keep on Pushing", Rounder Records, FLY 561 (1991)
 Country Gazette, "Strictly Instrumental", Flying Fish, FF 446 (1987)
 Country Gazette, "Bluegrass Tonight", Flying Fish, FF 383 (1986)
 Alan Munde, "In the Tradition", Ridge Runner, RRR 0035
 Country Gazette, "America's Bluegrass Band", Flying Fish, FF 295 (1983)
 Alan Munde, "Festival favorites, Southwest sessions", Ridge Runner, RRR 0032 (1983)
 Alan Munde, "Festival favorites, Nashville sessions", Ridge Runner, RRR 0031 (1982)
 Country Gazette, "American and Clean", Flying Fish, FF 253 (1981)
 Alan Munde, "Festival favorites, Volume 2", Ridge Runner, RRR 0027 (1980)
 Alan Munde, "Festival favorites, Volume 1", Ridge Runner, RRR 0026 (1980)
 Alan Munde, "The banjo kid picks again", Ridge Runner, RRR 0022
 Country Gazette, "What a Way to Make a Living", Ridge Runner, RRR 0008 (1977)
 Sam Bush & Alan Munde, "Together again for the first time", Ridge Runner, RRR 0007, (1977)
 Country Gazette, "Out to Lunch", Flying Fish, FF027 (1976)
 Alan Munde, "Banjo Sandwich", Ridge Runner, RRR 0001 (1975)
 Country Gazette, "Live", United Artists Records, (1974)
 Country Gazette, "Don't Give Up Your Day Job", United Artists Records, (1973)
 Country Gazette, "Traitor in Our Midst", United Artists Records, UAS 5596 (1972)
 Sam Bush & Alan Munde, "Poor Richards Almanac", Ridge Runner, RRR 0002 (1968)

References

''Trischka, Tony, Wernick, Pete (1988), "Masters of the 5-String Banjo", Oak Publications. .

External links
 
 
 
 
 http://www.melbay.com/authors.asp?author=223
 http://www.eddiecollins.biz/mundsm95.html
 https://web.archive.org/web/20080828020359/http://www.thebluegrassjournal.com/ts-art-alanmunde.html
 Country Gazette Discography
 Recording: Jam at Culpeper-Warrenton 1973 with many other stars
 
 

1946 births
Living people
Musicians from Norman, Oklahoma
American bluegrass musicians
American banjoists
Country musicians from Oklahoma